Ampang District was a district in Malaysia that was split into sections, with Federal Territory of Kuala Lumpur and the state of Selangor each taking a part.

Administration
Initially under Selangor jurisdiction, the district was split following the declaration of Kuala Lumpur as a Federal Territory in 1974. The township of Ampang is located in the Federal Territory side and is an eastern suburb of Kuala Lumpur. The district is now divided into two parts:

 Ampang, Selangor, the Selangor segment of Ampang, also known as Ampang Jaya.
 Ampang, Kuala Lumpur, the Kuala Lumpur segment of Ampang, alternately known as Ampang Hilir.

The district was adjacent to Cheras, Kuala Lumpur and northeast of the Kuala Lumpur Central Business District.

Demographics
In 1880, the face of the settlement was drastically altered when the British decided to move their capital of the Federated Malay States inland from Klang, and declared the neighbouring city of Kuala Lumpur to be the new capital. Malays are the largest ethnicity in the Ampang area with 52% of the total population, followed by those of Chinese ancestry at 28%. The smallest racial group is Indian at 20%.

The original "kampongs" (unimproved village structures) of the area were eventually replaced by brick buildings sporting tile roofs, of a standardized shop-house design. Plots were regulated with wider streets between them and "sanitary lanes" behind them. The streets and roads were surfaced with locally found laterite gravel.

Salary
Approximately 70% of the residents of Ampang have monthly salaries at or above RM3,000 (Ringgit Malaysia), 10% have monthly salaries in the range of RM1000 to RM2999, with the remaining 20% earning RM1000 or less per month.

Public Facilities and Places

Mall, Hypermarket and Supermarket

Recreation
Taman Tasik Ampang Hilir (Ampang, Kuala Lumpur)
Laman Rekreasi Tasik Tambahan
Taman Bandar Taman Kosas
Taman Rekreasi Bukit Indah

LRT Station 

Bus Routes 

Highways

Hospital
 Hospital Ampang
 KPJ Ampang Puteri Specialist Hospital
 Pantai Hospital
 Gleneagles Hospital

Places of Interest and Focus
 Zoo Negara
 Ampang Recreational Forest
 Kelab Darul Ehsan

References

External links
Ampang community website on Archive.org

Districts of Malaysia
Selangor
Geography of Kuala Lumpur
History of Kuala Lumpur